Nap-of-the-earth (NOE) is a type of very low-altitude flight course used by military aircraft to avoid enemy detection and attack in a high-threat environment. Other, mostly older terms include "ground-hugging", "terrain masking",  "flying under the radar" and "hedgehopping".

During NOE flight, geographical features are used as cover, exploiting valleys and folds in the terrain by flying in, rather than over, them. This keeps the aircraft below enemy air defence radar coverage, avoiding being silhouetted against the sky.

Purpose  
NOE is used to minimize detection by hostile aircraft, AWACS surveillance and control systems, ground-based radar, or attack targets.

A high-flying aircraft can be detected by defense systems at long range, giving an air defense system time to react, alerting SAM and AAA systems and fighter aircraft. Using NOE flight, the approach may be undetected; the aircraft "pops up" to attack the target and then turns to escape before the enemy can respond. Doppler radar has the potential to detect NOE flight, but the incoming aircraft has to be within radar range in the first place, and low flight minimizes this possibility by using hills and mountains to break the line of sight (terrain masking), defeating terrestrial air defense radar and in rough enough terrain also airborne early warning.

Sensors for NOE  
Most NOE flying is done during the day using visual reference by pilots who are experienced in low flying. Data from a radar altimeter or terrain-following radar system is also used, the latter enabling low flying in adverse weather where it would not be possible by visual reference and manual pilot control. At night, a night-vision device may be used.

Helicopter NOE flying 

The lowest NOE flying is by helicopters because they have lower speeds and more maneuverability than fixed-wing aircraft, particularly fast-jets. Helicopters can fly at treetop levels or even below the height of surrounding trees where there are clear areas (such as in river gullies), flying under wires (such as electricity cables) rather than over them. Attack helicopters can hide behind trees or buildings, "popping up" with minimum exposure, just enough to use their (rotor mast-mounted) radar or other sensors and launch weapons. Over populated areas with tall radio transmission towers, an altitude of  AGL applies.

Height above ground level
Height above ground level (AGL) in NOE and low flying generally vary with the aircraft speed, aircraft maneuverability and the ruggedness of the terrain. Helicopters are capable of flying with no more than a few feet of clearance below the helicopter's skids or wheels. Power wires are a danger to all aircraft flying at low level and "wire strikes" are common, such as the Cavalese cable car disaster. Special maps are produced that plot the routes of these wires but these are difficult to keep up-to-date, especially for foreign/enemy countries. Pilots are trained to scan for the pylons or power-poles that support these wires, because they can be seen at a distance where the wires themselves cannot.

See also
Low flying military training
Low-altitude parachute-extraction system
Radar altimeter
Radar horizon
Sea skimming (missiles)
Terrain-following radar

References 

Aerial maneuvers
Aerial warfare tactics
Low flying